is a female Japanese judoka.  She started Judo at the age of 14.  She won All-Japan judo championships 2 times（1997–1998.  She has also won silver and bronze medals at the 1997 and 1999 World Judo Championships. However, she was defeated at the Olympic trials so she could not participate in the 2000 Olympics.

References

External links
JudoInside.com Miho Ninomiya

1975 births
Living people
Japanese female judoka
Asian Games medalists in judo
Judoka at the 1998 Asian Games
Asian Games bronze medalists for Japan

Medalists at the 1998 Asian Games
20th-century Japanese women
21st-century Japanese women